William Collinson Sawyer (1831 – 15 March 1868) was a colonial Anglican bishop in the third quarter of the nineteenth century.

Education
He was born in 1831 and educated at Abingdon School, from 1845 to 1850  and Oriel College, Oxford.

Career
After some years as the Vicar of Tunbridge Wells, he was appointed the inaugural Bishop of Grafton and Armidale in Australia  on 30 January 1867 and consecrated to the episcopate at Canterbury Cathedral on the Feast of the Purification (2 February 1867), by Charles Longley, Archbishop of Canterbury. He died by drowning when his boat was upset in the Clarence River on Sunday 15 March 1868.

Whilst his status upon consecration was bishop-designate for the Diocese of Grafton and Armidale, he was never formally enthroned in his cathedral-designate, St Peter's Armidale, due to his drowning prior to his formal enthronement. His episcopal status therefore remained forever as a suffragan bishop in the Diocese of Newcastle.

The Act of the NSW Legislative Council 41st Victoria 1877 at page 23 inter alia contains the following:

"And whereas the Lord Archbishop of Canterbury having obtained Her Majesty's license or mandate by warrant under the Royal sign manual and signet did on the twenty-fourth day of February one thousand eight hundred and sixty-nine with other Bishops of the Church of England assisting him consecrate the Right Reverend James Francis Turner Doctor in Divinity with the intent and for the purpose that the said Bishop should exercise his functions in the said new see or diocese of Grafton and Armidale."

The Act makes no reference to William Collinson Sawyer as being a bishop of Grafton and Armidale, clearly indicating that he never legally became Bishop.

James Francis Turner was formally enthroned in St Peter's Armidale on 10 September 1869, legally constituting him as the first Bishop of Grafton and Armidale.

See also

 List of Old Abingdonians

References

1832 births
1868 deaths
People from Hedon
People educated at Abingdon School
Alumni of Oriel College, Oxford
Anglican bishops of Grafton and Armidale
19th-century Anglican bishops in Australia
Accidental deaths in New South Wales
Deaths by drowning in Australia